Stevens County is a county located in the U.S. state of Washington along the Canada–US border. At the 2020 census, its population was 46,445. As of July 2021, the population was estimated to be 47,426. The county seat and largest city is Colville. The county was created in 1863 and named after Isaac Stevens, the first governor of Washington Territory.

Stevens County is included in the Spokane-Spokane Valley, WA Metropolitan Statistical Area.

Geography

Geographic features
 Columbia River

Adjacent counties
 Pend Oreille County – east
 Spokane County – southeast
 Lincoln County – southwest
 Ferry County – west
 Kootenay Boundary Regional District, British Columbia  – northeast
 Regional District of Central Kootenay, British Columbia – north

National protected areas
 Pacific Northwest National Scenic Trail (part)
 Colville National Forest (part)
 Kaniksu National Forest (part)
 Lake Roosevelt National Recreation Area (part)
 Little Pend Oreille National Wildlife Refuge (part)

Demographics

2000 census
At the 2000 census there were 40,066 people, 15,017 households, and 11,022 families in the county.  The population density was 16 people per square mile (6/km2).  There were 17,599 housing units at an average density of 7 per square mile (3/km2).  The racial makeup of the county was 90.05% White, 0.28% Black or African American, 5.66% Native American, 0.48% Asian, 0.16% Pacific Islander, 0.68% from other races, and 2.70% from two or more races.  1.84%. were Hispanic or Latino of any race. 20.6% were of German, 18.9% United States or American, 10.0% English, 7.9% Irish and 5.0% Norwegian ancestry.

Of the 15,017 households 34.40% had children under the age of 18 living with them, 60.40% were married couples living together, 8.70% had a female householder with no husband present, and 26.60% were non-families. 22.00% of households were one person and 8.80% were one person aged 65 or older.  The average household size was 2.64 and the average family size was 3.08.

The age distribution was 28.70% under the age of 18, 6.40% from 18 to 24, 24.90% from 25 to 44, 27.10% from 45 to 64, and 12.90% 65 or older.  The median age was 39 years. For every 100 females there were 99.10 males.  For every 100 females age 18 and over, there were 96.60 males.

The median household income was $34,673 and the median family income  was $40,250. Males had a median income of $35,256 versus $23,679 for females. The per capita income for the county was $15,895.  About 11.50% of families and 15.90% of the population were below the poverty line, including 19.80% of those under age 18 and 11.90% of those age 65 or over.

2010 census
The racial makeup of the county was 88.9% White, 0.6% Black or African American, 1.5% Native American, 1.5% Asian, 0.2% Pacific Islander, 3.5% from other races, 3.7% two or more races. Those of Hispanic or Latino origin made up 2.7% of the population. In terms of ancestry, 24.6% were German, 14.2% were Irish, 13.7% were English, 6.4% were Norwegian, and 6.1% were American.

Of the households, 29.6% had children under the age of 18 living with them, 56.3% were married couples living together, 9.0% had a female householder with no husband present, 29.9% were non-families, and 24.6% of households were made up of individuals. The average household size was 2.50 and the average family size was 2.95. The median age was 45.0 years.

The median household income was $42,845 and the median family income  was $51,544. Males had a median income of $46,721 versus $33,651 for females. The per capita income for the county was $21,773. About 11.0% of families and 15.1% of the population were below the poverty line, including 21.1% of those under age 18 and 9.3% of those age 65 or over.

Communities

Cities
 Chewelah
 Colville (county seat)
 Kettle Falls

Towns
 Marcus
 Northport
 Springdale

Census-designated places
 Addy
 Clayton
 Loon Lake

 Suncrest

 Valley

Unincorporated communities

 Arden
 Bluecreek
 Cedonia
 Daisy
 Echo
 Evans
 Ford
 Fruitland
 Gifford
 Hunters
 Nine Mile Falls
 Onion Creek
 Rice
 Tumtum (also known as Tum Tum)
 Wellpinit

Politics

See also
 National Register of Historic Places listings in Stevens County, Washington

References

Further reading
 Available online through the Washington State Library's Classics in Washington History collection

External links
 Stevens County, Washington Government Page
 The Stevens County Wiki Project: A community wiki project, dedicated to creating an online wiki guide to Stevens County, Washington.  Powered by Media Wiki.
 Stevens County Rural Library District: hosts of the Stevens County Wiki Project, the Stevens County Library District (SCRLD) has various regional links available from their website.
 Stevens County Heritage Historical photos and documents from the Libraries of Stevens County.
 uppercolumbia.net: a regional portal site for Stevens County and beyond.    Includes business links and events calendar.
 The Heritage Network: History and Genealogy Resources for the Upper Columbia Region.
 An 1884 hailstorm in Stevens County on Wikisource
 Crossroads on the Columbia Preserve America Project Interpretive Section
 Crossroads on the Columbia Preserve America Project collection, exhibits, and images from museum and private collections covering Stevens County

 
1863 establishments in Washington Territory
Populated places established in 1863
Eastern Washington